LeQuan Letrell Lewis (born February 17, 1989) is an American football cornerback who is currently a free agent. He was signed by the Tennessee Titans as an undrafted free agent in 2011. He played college football at Arizona State.

Professional career

Tennessee Titans
On July 26, 2011, he was signed by the Tennessee Titans as an undrafted free agent. On September 2, 2011, he was released.

Oakland Raiders
In 2012, he signed with the Oakland Raiders. On June 23, 2012, he was released.

New York Jets
The New York Jets signed Lewis on August 15, 2012. He was waived on August 25, 2012. On August 30, 2012, he was re-signed. He was waived a day later. Lewis was signed to the Jets' practice squad on September 5, 2012. He was released on September 11, 2012.

Dallas Cowboys
Lewis was signed to the Dallas Cowboys' active roster on September 12, 2012. On October 2, 2012, he was released.

Chicago Bears
On February 11, 2013, Lewis was signed by the Chicago Bears. He was released on May 13.

New England Patriots
On August 12, 2013, Lewis was signed by the New England Patriots. On August 26, 2013, he was cut by the Patriots.

Arizona Cardinals
On April 1, 2014, Lewis signed with the Arizona Cardinals to a two-year deal. He was released by the Cardinals on May 27, 2014.

Toronto Argonauts
On June 13, 2014, Lewis signed with the Toronto Argonauts of the Canadian Football League.

Second stint with the Jets
Lewis was signed by the New York Jets on August 12, 2014. He was released on August 31, 2014 and signed to the team's practice squad the following day. He was promoted to the active roster on September 24, 2014, but was released on September 29, 2014. He was re-signed to the practice squad a day later. He was released on October 7, 2014.

Lewis participated in The Spring League in 2017.

References

External links
Toronto Argonauts bio
Arizona State Sun Devils bio

1989 births
Living people
American football cornerbacks
Canadian football defensive backs
American players of Canadian football
Arizona State Sun Devils football players
African-American players of American football
Oakland Raiders players
Tennessee Titans players
New York Jets players
Dallas Cowboys players
Tampa Bay Buccaneers players
Chicago Bears players
New England Patriots players
Arizona Cardinals players
Toronto Argonauts players
The Spring League players
Players of American football from Los Angeles
21st-century African-American sportspeople
20th-century African-American people